The Lansing Group is a geologic group in Nebraska, Iowa, Missouri and Kansas. It preserves fossils dating back to the Carboniferous period.

See also

 List of fossiliferous stratigraphic units in Nebraska
 Paleontology in Nebraska

References
 

Carboniferous geology of Nebraska
Geologic groups of Nebraska
Carboniferous System of North America